More than two hundred and forty municipalities in the Canadian province of Quebec held mayoral and council elections on November 1, 1998.

Results

Montreal

Montréal-Nord

Sherbrooke

Bromont

Robert Desourdy is the son of Rolland Desourdy, who served as mayor of Cowansville for nineteen years and founded Bromont as a "model town" in the early 1960s. Rolland's brother, Germain Desourdy, also served a mayor Bromont in the 1970s. In the 1980s, the younger Desourdy oversaw family interests such as a ski resort and golf course. He served as mayor of Bromont from 1996 until 1998, when he was defeated by Pauline Quinlan. He sought to return to council in a May 2001 by-election, but was defeated. Desourdy later announced that he would seek the mayoralty again in 2005, but he ultimately chose not to file his nomination papers.

Cowansville

Jacques Charbonneau served as mayor of Cowansville from 1986 until 1998, when he lost to Arthur Fauteux. He also sought the Progressive Conservative Party of Canada nomination for Brome—Missisquoi prior to the 1993 federal election, without success. After leaving the mayoralty, he became a board member of Memphremagog Conservation Incorporated. Charbonneau is the father of Bromont politician Patrick Charbonneau and football player Steve Charbonneau.

Magog

Newspaper coverage indicates that the contest was close, with Poulin winning by about one hundred votes.

Source for election results: "Quebec election results stay true to polls," Montreal Gazette, 3 November 1998, A8.

References

1998 elections in Canada
1998
1998 in Quebec